The 12th Illinois Infantry Regiment, also known as the 1st Scotch Regiment, was an infantry regiment that served in the Union Army between May 2, 1861 and July 18, 1865, during the American Civil War.

Service

Initial 3 month service
The infantry regiment was organized at Springfield, Illinois and mustered in on May 2, 1861 for a three-month service. The regiment was transferred to Cairo, Illinois, for garrison duty until August 1861. By the time the regiment was mustered out on August 1, 1861, they had lost four to disease.

3 year service
The 12th Illinois Infantry was mustered into Federal service for a three-year enlistment on August 1, 1861, at Cairo, Illinois.

The regiment was mustered out on July 18, 1865, at Camp Butler National Cemetery Camp Butler, Illinois.

Total strength and casualties
The regiment suffered 5 officers and 143 enlisted men killed in action or mortally wounded and 3 officers and 109 enlisted men who died of disease, for a total of 260 fatalities.

Commanders
Colonel John McArthur – promoted to brigadier general on May 1, 1862.
Colonel Augustus L. Chetlain  – promoted to brigadier general on December 19, 1863.
Lieutenant Colonel Henry Van Sellars – mustered out with the regiment.

See also

List of Illinois Civil War units
Illinois in the American Civil War
65th Illinois Volunteer Infantry Regiment, "The Second Scotch Regiment"

References

Bibliography 
 Dyer, Frederick H. (1959). A Compendium of the War of the Rebellion. New York and London. Thomas Yoseloff, Publisher. .

External links 
The Civil War Archive

Units and formations of the Union Army from Illinois
1861 establishments in Illinois
Military units and formations established in 1861
Military units and formations disestablished in 1865